Charles Holland (12 March 1733 – 7 December 1769) was an English actor, born in Chiswick, the son of a baker.

Life

Holland made his first appearance on the stage in the title role of Oroonoko at Drury Lane in 1755, John Palmer, Richard Yates and Susanna Cibber being in the cast. He played under David Garrick, and was the original Florizel in the latter's adaptation of Shakespeare's The Winter's Tale.

Holland died from smallpox at the age of 36. He was engaged to the actress Jane Pope, but she broke off the engagement when she found him boating at Richmond with the actress Sophia Baddeley. He was known for having affairs; the one with Mrs K. Earle led her husband, William Earle, to prosecute Holland successfully.

Garrick thought highly of him, and wrote a eulogistic epitaph for his monument in St Nicholas Church, Chiswick. 
His tomb was sculpted by William Tyler RA.

His nephew, Charles Holland (1768–1849) was also an actor, who played with Sarah Siddons and Edmund Kean.

Notes

References

1733 births
1769 deaths
Deaths from smallpox
English male stage actors
People from Chiswick
18th-century English male actors